The Northern New Hampshire Correctional Facility (NNHCF) is a state prison in Berlin, New Hampshire, United States. It is a part of the New Hampshire Department of Corrections.

NNHCF contains only medium security male prisoners and has a maximum capacity of approximately 500 prisoners. In May 2009 this prison was modified to hold a total of over 740 inmates, due to the closing of the Lakes Region Facility in Laconia.

It employs approximately 200 people, including correctional officers, medical staff, and administration officials. The Warden is Corey Riendeau.

References

External links
Northern New Hampshire Correctional Facility (Berlin)

Prisons in New Hampshire
Berlin, New Hampshire
Buildings and structures in Coös County, New Hampshire
2000 establishments in New Hampshire